Châtillon may refer to:

Châtillon (family)
 Hugh I of Châtillon
First Battle of Châtillon during the war in the Vendée (1793), fought in what was then Châtillon-sur-Sèvre (now  Mauléon, Deux-Sèvres) 
Battle of Châtillon, fought at Châtillon, Hauts-de-Seine during the Siege of Paris (1870–1871)

It is the name of several places:
In Belgium
Châtillon, Belgium, in the province of Luxembourg
In Canada
Châtillon River, a tributary of Broadback River, in Quebec
In Italy
Châtillon, Aosta Valley
In Switzerland
Châtillon, Fribourg, in the Canton of Fribourg
Châtillon, Canton of Jura, in the Canton of Jura
Châtillon, Bern, part of the municipality of Prêles in the Canton of Bern
Châtillon (peak), a peak in the western Bernese Alps
Châtillon-le-Bas, French name for Niedergesteln, canton of Valais
Châtillon-sur-Glâne, an archaeological site near Posieux, canton of Fribourg
In France
Châtillon, Allier, in the Allier département
Châtillon, Jura, France, in the Jura département 
Châtillon, Rhône, in the Rhône département
Châtillon, Vienne, in the Vienne département 
Châtillon, Hauts-de-Seine, in the Hauts-de-Seine département
Châtillon-Coligny, in the Loiret département
Châtillon-de-Michaille, the former name of Châtillon-en-Michaille, in the Ain département 
Châtillon-en-Bazois, in the Nièvre département 
Châtillon-en-Diois, in the Drôme département
Châtillon-en-Dunois, in the Eure-et-Loir département 
Châtillon-en-Michaille, in the Ain département 
Châtillon-en-Vendelais, in the Ille-et-Vilaine département 
Châtillon-Guyotte, in the Doubs département
Châtillon-la-Borde, in the Seine-et-Marne département 
Châtillon-la-Palud, in the Ain département
Châtillon-le-Duc, in the Doubs département 
Châtillon-le-Roi, in the Loiret département 
Châtillon-les-Dombes, the former name of Châtillon-sur-Chalaronne, in the Ain département
Châtillon-lès-Sons, in the Aisne département 
Châtillon-Saint-Jean, in the Drôme département 
Châtillon-sous-Bagneux is the former name of Châtillon, Hauts-de-Seine
Châtillon-sous-les-Côtes, in the Meuse département 
Châtillon-sur-Broué, in the Marne département
Châtillon-sur-Chalaronne, in the Ain département 
Châtillon-sur-Cher, in the Loir-et-Cher département
Châtillon-sur-Cluses, in the Haute-Savoie département 
Châtillon-sur-Colmont, in the Mayenne département
Châtillon-sur-Indre, in the Indre département 
Châtillon-sur-Lison, in the Doubs  département 
Châtillon-sur-Loing is the former name of Châtillon-Coligny, in the Loiret département
Châtillon-sur-Loire, in the Loiret département 
Châtillon-sur-Marne, in the Marne département
Châtillon-sur-Morin, in the Marne département 
Châtillon-sur-Oise, in the Aisne département
Châtillon-sur-Saône, in the Vosges département 
Châtillon-sur-Seine, in the Côte-d'Or département   
Châtillon-sur-Sèvre, part of Mauléon in the Deux-Sèvres département, 
Châtillon-sur-Thouet, in the Deux-Sèvres département